Pristimantis viejas is a species of frog in the family Strabomantidae. It is endemic to the Andes of Colombia and is known from eastern flanks/base of the northern Cordillera Central and from western flank of the Cordillera Oriental. The specific name viejas is a Spanish expression meaning "pretty young women", in reference to three biologist who had studied this species.

Description
Adult males measure  and adult females  in snout–vent length. The snout is long, subacuminate in dorsal view,
and rounded in lateral profile. The tympanum is round and prominent. The fingers and the toes have lateral fringes and round terminal discs but no webbing. Dorsal skin has many non-conical tubercles.  The dorsum is copper brown. There are irregular spots that are cream, nearly black, or orange. The flanks are dark brown with paler slanting stripes. The posterior/hidden surfaces of the thighs are dark brown with orange spot. The venter is almost white to pinkish. Grey marbling may be present on the throat. The iris is pale copper to reddish-copper, with thick black reticulation.

Habitat and conservation
Individuals can be found under bushes, in forest edge, secondary forest, and in open areas in forests. It is nocturnal. Breeding occurs through direct development (i.e., there is no free-living larval stage).

Pristimantis viejas is a common and adaptable species that seems to benefit from a degree of disturbance to forest habitats. It is not facing any significant threats.

References

viejas
Amphibians of the Andes
Amphibians of Colombia
Endemic fauna of Colombia
Taxa named by John Douglas Lynch
Amphibians described in 1999
Taxonomy articles created by Polbot